Baker Lake may refer to:

Canada
Baker Lake, Nunavut, a community in Canada
Baker Lake (Nunavut)
Baker Lake Airport, the airport serving the community
Baker Lake Water Aerodrome, a water aerodrome serving the community during part of the year
Baker Lake (electoral district), a territorial electoral district (riding) for the Legislative Assembly of Nunavut
Lac-Baker, New Brunswick
Lac-Baker Parish, New Brunswick

United States
Baker Lake (California), a lake in Shasta County
Baker Lake (Blaine County, Idaho), a lake in Blaine County
Baker Lake (Custer County, Idaho), a lake in Custer County
Baker Lake (Maine), a lake in Somerset County
Baker Lake (Washington), a lake in Whatcom County

fr:Lac Baker